T.A. Oakes Building, is a historic commercial building in Carmel-by-the-Sea, California. It was built in 1922, by builder Thomas A. Oakes and designed by architect Thomas W. Morgan for a new Post Office and City Hall. It is an example of  Western false front and Spanish Colonial Revival architecture styles. The building qualifies as an important building in the city's downtown historic district property survey and was recorded with the California Register of Historical Resources on October 28, 2002.

History

The T.A. Oakes Building was established in 1922 and used as the new Post Office and City Hall. It is located on Dolores Street and 7th Avenue in Carmel-by-the-Sea, California. It is a modern two-story wood-framed, brick, and stucco building with double-hung Bay windows with a Spanish tile roof. The building has a common wall with the Oakes Building (see section below). It was built for William H. Abbott, of Pebble Beach, in 1923. Builder Hugh W. Comstock designed a fire escape hidden by a passageway door and wall. The ground floor exterior was changed in 1959 by architects Thomas S. Elston, Jr., and William L. Cranston. Other tenants included: Dr. Hollison and Halle Samson, Conway Of Asia, an Asian antique gallery (now at Mission Street between 5th & 6th Avenues).

The building has undergone several changes. In 1959, for owner Halle Samson, the first floor was remodeled with a low hipped roof, copper canopy, and store front for $3,500. It was remodeled, by architects Elston and Cranston, for the shop interior at a cost of $2,500.

The building qualified for inclusion in the city's Downtown Historic District Property Survey, and was registered with the California Register of Historical Resources on October 28, 2002. The building is significant under the California Register criterion 1, in the area of history because it served as Post Office (1922-1934), Carmel City Hall (1927-1946), Police Department, and Council Chambers on the upper floors.

Oakes Building

The Oakes Building is a historic commercial building in Carmel-by-the-Sea, California adjacent to the T.A. Oakes Building. It was built in 1923, by builder Thomas A. Oakes and designed by architect Thomas Morgan for William H. Abbott of Pebble Beach. It is an example of Spanish Colonial Revival architecture. It is a 45 , two-story wood-framed and stucco building with a flat tar and gravel roof. The upper floor has four symmetrical bay windows and flower boxes below. The first floor has storefront showcase windows. In 1926, the property was worth $20,000. There was a remodel of the upstairs window bays in 1997. It shares a common wall with the T.A. Oakes Building on Dolores Street and 7th Avenue. Tenants included: Paul J. Denny, who had the only car dealership on the Monterey Peninsula for the Oldsmobile and Peerless Motor Company; Lester Roberts (1926), J. R. Sprague (1939), and Tirey Ford (1940s). The building was used as a bakery, hardware store, candy store and art galleries. The building is now occupied by the New Masters Gallery, which did an interior remodel in April 1963 for $20,000.

A dispute between Morgan, Oakes, and Abbott over the title to the Oakes building resulted in a settlement where attorney Argyll Campbell representing Morgan, won the case with a clear title turned over to Morgan.

The building qualifies as an important building in the city's downtown historic district property survey and was recorded with the California Register of Historical Resources on November 5, 2002. The building is significant under the California Register criterion 1, in the area of history because it has a common wall to the T.A. Oakes building that housed the Carmel Post Office (1922-1934), City Hall, Police Department, and Council Chambers in the 1920-30s.

Thomas A. Oakes

Thomas Albert Oakes (1857-1927) was a building contractor from Santa Cruz who also helped construct some of the city streets. He was a resident of Carmel-by-the-Sea for many years working on architectural designs for homes and buildings. He built the T.A. Oakes Building for a new post office in Carmel-by-the-Sea in 1922.

Oakes was born on February 12, 1857, in Boston, Massachusetts. His father died when he was Thomas was four months old. His mother brought her son to California in 1857 via the Isthmus of Panama to Susanville, California where he was raised until he was 12 years old. He learned the trade of woodworking in the furniture shop of W. S. Chadburn in San Francisco. He then moved to Reno, Nevada where he was in the furniture business for 10 years. He moved to Richmond, California where he went into building. He built the first public hall, the Pottery Works, and other buildings on Howard, Mission, Larkin, and California Streets. He was a superintendent of construction on a pottery plant, the West Coast Porcelain Manufacturing in Burlingame, California. He built the Live Oaks School in Sant Cruz, the first brick schoolhouse in the district, and built and sold houses in Santa Cruz County, California, and a number of homes in the Chris Johnson and the Wilson tracts.

He married Abbie E. Nash of Lexington, Michigan, in Reno, Nevada, on April 27, 1887. They had one daughter, Margaret Elizabeth Oakes, in 1910. He was a resident of San Cruz, California since 1912 and lived at 86 Seabright Avenue. His father was Moses Oakes and mother was Margaret Wallace.

Oakes died on October 9, 1927, in Santa Cruz, California of heart failure. He was 71 years old.

Thomas W. Morgan

Thomas Wolfe Morgan, Jr., (1875-1940), was born on August 22, 1875, in Oakland, California. His parents were Thomas Wolfe Morgan (1839-1903) and Cristina Agnes Ross (1847-1922). He came to Carmel in 1920 to join his sister, Carmel artist Mary DeNeale Morgan (1868-1948). Thomas Morgan was a resident of Carmel-by-the-Sea for 20 years working on architectural designs for homes and buildings. He was knew Jack London from Oakland, California. He loved books, art, and music. He played the flute.

Morgan plans and specifications for a new Carmel Post Office, at the T.A. Oakes Building on the Dolores Street in Carmel were accepted by the department in Washington. The lease was for ten years of occupancy.

Morgan died, at age 64, in a Salinas, California hospital of a heart attack on February 5, 1940. Services were held at a Salinas funeral home.

See also
 List of American architects

References

External links

 Downtown Conservation District Historic Property Survey
 Historic Walking Tour

1922 establishments in California
Carmel-by-the-Sea, California
Buildings and structures in Monterey County, California
Rebuilt buildings and structures in the United States